Only Men Aloud is a male voice choir from Wales. The choir came to national prominence in the UK when they won the Last Choir Standing competition run by BBC television during 2008.

Overview
The choir was formed by Tim Rhys-Evans, a classically trained singer and former musical director of Welsh National Youth Opera. It originally had 15 members and is based in Cardiff.

Following Last Choir Standing, the choir signed a five-record deal with Universal Music and released their first album. They performed with Josh Groban at The Royal Variety Performance in 2008.

The choir embarked on their first UK tour in April/May 2009 with singer and soap star Amy Nuttall joining them as a special guest. The performance at the Cardiff International Arena featured a one-off performance with Bonnie Tyler.

In October 2009, the choir held auditions at the Wales Millennium Centre, Cardiff to find two new members to join them. Later that month the choir's second album, Band of Brothers, went straight to number one in the UK Classical Charts, where it remained for three weeks. TV choir top of classical chart The album went on to win the NS&I Album of the Year 2010 at the Classical Brit awards.

The choir embarked on their second UK tour in December 2009. Their special guest was Welsh soprano Gwawr Edwards.  In 2010, the choir was given its own Welsh-language television series, Only Men Aloud, on S4C.

In May 2010 Tim Rhys Evans embarked on a new project, to revive the male voice choir tradition, by forming Only Boys Aloud The boys made their first public appearance at the Ebbw Vale Eisteddfod in Ebbw Vale and received three standing ovations for their renditions of Calon Lan, Sosban Fach and Don't Stop Believing.

Only Men Aloud! completed a 16-date UK Christmas Tour in December 2010. Their special guest was West End singer, Katy Treharne. The show at the CIA in Cardiff also featured Only Boys Aloud who sang "Don't Stop Believing" and "You Raise me Up" with Only Men Aloud!

Only Men Aloud! were also the musical guests on the Christmas Day 2010 edition of BBC One's Strictly Come Dancing. They sang a specially-arranged version of "Silent Night" and "I'll Be Home For Christmas".

In 2011, Only Men Aloud released their third album called In Festive Mood, made a 15-date UK Christmas Tour and released Only Men Aloud - The Book. In Festive Mood entered the UK Classical Charts at Number 8.  A BBC Wales series, Only Boys Aloud: the Academy, was devoted to Only Boys Aloud!

On 27 July 2012, Only Men Aloud performed at the opening ceremony of the 2012 Olympic Games. They performed on Caliban's Dream, as the Olympic cauldron was lit. The track is featured on the soundtrack of the ceremony, Isles of Wonder.  It was digitally released as a downloadable track on iTunes at midnight on 27 July after the ceremony.  It was the highest placed track from the soundtrack on iTunes in the UK, reaching no. 5 when the charts were announced on 29 July. On 5 August, it entered the main charts at number 12.

Tim Rhys-Evans was awarded an MBE in the Queen's Birthday Honours list in June 2013. He was awarded the honour for services to music and for charitable services.

In May 2013, It was announced that Only Men Aloud would go through a radical restructure later in the year to become an eight piece group. The decision was  made for logistical reasons as they looked to expand their global appeal. At the end of September 2013, the new look line up was announced and the new eight piece group performed two shows in the Elgar Rooms, Royal Albert Hall. In 2014 they made a 12-date spring tour of Wales, a summer tour of the Midwest of the US, and a 12-date UK Christmas Tour. Another two-part TV series for S4C was shown in December. In February 2015, Only Men Aloud cycled from Cardiff to Paris for charity, arriving in time to sing the Welsh National Anthem on the pitch before the France vs Wales RBS Six Nations game.

Line-up

Wyn Davies,
David Fortey,

Tom Hier,
David Mahoney,
Steffan Hughes

Niall Allen,
Craig Yates,

Huw Euron,
Stephen Hamnett.

Previous members include David Thaxton (Les Misérables, Passion), Alan Winner (Gone with the Wind), Noel Sullivan (Hear'Say)!, and  Jon Robyns (Avenue Q, Les Misérables).

Discography

Albums

Singles

As featured artist

Awards
Classic Brit Awards

British Phonographic Industry

References

External links
Website
Official Record Label Website
BBC profile

Boys' and men's choirs
Musical groups established in 2000
Welsh choirs